The non-metropolitan county of Lincolnshire
is divided into 7 parliamentary constituencies – 1 borough constituency and 6 county constituencies.

Constituencies

2010 boundary changes

In the Fifth Review the Boundary Commission for England recommended that Lincolnshire retained its current constituencies, with minor changes only to reflect revisions to local authority ward boundaries and to reduce the electoral disparity between constituencies.

Proposed boundary changes 
See 2023 Periodic Review of Westminster constituencies for further details.

Following the abandonment of the Sixth Periodic Review (the 2018 review), the Boundary Commission for England formally launched the 2023 Review on 5 January 2021. Initial proposals were published on 8 June 2021 and, following two periods of public consultation, revised proposals were published on 8 November 2022. Final proposals will be published by 1 July 2023.

The commission has proposed including Lincolnshire with Leicestershire and Rutland in a sub-region of the East Midlands region, creating one additional seat by re-establishing the constituency of Rutland and Stamford, which spans all three counties. Consequently, Grantham and Stamford is renamed Grantham. The following seats are proposed:

Containing electoral wards from Boston

 Boston and Skegness (part)

Containing electoral wards from East Lyndsey

 Boston and Skegness (part)
 Louth and Horncastle

Containing electoral wards from Lincoln

 Lincoln (part)

Containing electoral wards from North Kesteven

 Grantham (part)
 Lincoln (part)
 Sleaford and North Hykeham

Containing electoral wards from South Holland

 South Holland and The Deepings (part)

Containing electoral wards from South Kesteven

 Grantham (part)
 Rutland and Stamford (also comprises the county of Rutland and parts of Harborough in Leicestershire)
 South Holland and The Deepings (part)

Containing electoral wards from West Lyndsey

 Gainsborough

Results history 
Primary data source: House of Commons research briefing – General election results from 1918 to 2019

2019 
The number of votes cast for each political party who fielded candidates in constituencies comprising Lincolnshire in the 2019 general election were as follows:

Percentage votes 

11983 & 1987 – SDP-Liberal Alliance

* Included in Other

Seats 

11983 & 1987 – SDP-Liberal Alliance

Maps

Historical representation by party 
A cell marked → (with a different colour background to the preceding cell) indicates that the previous MP continued to sit under a new party name.

1885 to 1918

1918 to 1950

1950 to 1983

1983 to present

See also
 List of parliamentary constituencies in the East Midlands (region)
 List of parliamentary constituencies in Humberside for those covering North Lincolnshire and North East Lincolnshire unitary authorities.

Notes

References

Lincolnshire
Politics of Lincolnshire
Lincolnshire-related lists